Vienna has been an important center of musical innovation. 18th- and 19th-century composers were drawn to the city due to the patronage of the Habsburgs, and made Vienna the European capital of classical music. Joseph Haydn, Wolfgang Amadeus Mozart, Ludwig van Beethoven, Franz Schubert and Johann Strauss II, among others, were associated with the city, with Schubert being born in Vienna. During the Baroque period, Slavic and Hungarian folk forms influenced Austrian music. Vienna's status began its rise as a cultural center in the early 16th century, and was focused on instruments including the lute.

Yodel

Yodeling, a form of singing that involves rapid and repeated changes of register, was developed in the Alps. What Austria called it was "juchizn".

Rock and pop music

Falco was the most popular Austrian solo artist throughout the 1980s. His song "Rock Me Amadeus" reached number one of the Billboard Hot 100 in 1986. His sudden death in 1998 in the Dominican Republic catapulted his music from the 1980s once again into the spotlight.

Although Austria is not exactly the biggest exporter of international rock and pop-bands, there are a few notable musicians and bands.  Opus also made it in the charts worldwide as well. In the last few years, several music groups toured Europe and had commercial success in the international charts. The most prominent being Christina Stürmer. SheSays, who supported Bryan Adams on his European tour and some other bands like Cornerstone, are notable for their recent contributions. The bands Wanda and Bilderbuch became successful in the 2010s.

Blackened death metal trio Belphegor currently leads the Austrian metal scene, which also includes Hollenthon, Pungent Stench, Abigor, Disharmonic Orchestra, Visions of Atlantis, Dornenreich, Summoning and Estatic Fear.

Christian Fennesz is an Austrian electronic musician. Other electronic musicians who call Austria home include Der Blutharsch, active in the Neofolk scene, as are Sturmpercht.

Drummer Thomas Lang was born in Vienna in 1967, and has played with artists such as Robert Fripp, Geri Halliwell and Robbie Williams.

One of the few international touring bands is Killed By 9V Batteries and Gasmac Gilmore from Vienna.

Yearly the Waves Vienna Music Festival & Conference takes place in October. This festival is a showcase festival for European pop music acts.

Classical music

The Vienna Philharmonic is a world-renowned classical music ensemble and tours throughout the year all over the world.  Their New Year's Day concert held in Vienna every year in the Musikverein is one of Europe's most important classical concerts during the year.

Electronic music

There is a vital electronic music scene in Austria. Groups and artists include Parov Stelar, Bernhard Fleischmann, Kruder and Dorfmeister and Elektro Guzzi. Drum 'n' Bass also has a healthy reputation, with internationally successful Artists like Camo & Krooked, Disaszt, Ill.Skillz and Mefjus.

Neue Deutsche Härte

Neue Deutsche Härte (New German Hardness) is most popular in Austria and the rest of the German Sprachraum. Notable bands include Stahlhammer and L'Âme Immortelle, both of which have had some international success. The German band Samsas Traum is now based in Austria as well.

Eurovision success

At 2014, Conchita Wurst won the Eurovision Song Contest representing Austria. Conchita Wurst is a drag queen portrayed by Thomas "Tom" Neuwirth, which sparked some controversy. Following the win, the 60th anniversary Eurovision was held in Vienna in 2015. This was the second Eurovision contest to be held in Austria, first one being in 1967, after the winning performance Merci, Chérie by Udo Jürgens.

Other musicians 
Other commercially successful musicians are: Andreas Gabalier, DJ Ötzi, Hansi Hinterseer, RAF Camora, Hubert von Goisern, Wolfgang Ambros, Rainhard Fendrich, Georg Danzer, S.T.S., Erste Allgemeine Verunsicherung, Willi Resetarits, Papermoon, Seiler und Speer, Pizzera & Jaus, Die SEER, Nockalm Quintett, The Cistercian Monks of Stift Heiligenkreuz, Vienna Boys' Choir.

See also
Austrian folk dance
Ländler
List of Austrians in music
Music of Vienna
Music of Innsbruck
Schlager music#Germany and Austria

References

Further reading 
"Famous Austrian Composers." Naxos Records
Wagner, Christopher. "The Alpunk Phenomenon". 2000.  In Broughton, Simon and Ellingham, Mark  with McConnachie, James and Duane, Orla (Ed.), World Music, Vol. 1: Africa, Europe and the Middle East, pp 7–12. Rough Guides Ltd, Penguin Books. 
Wagner, Christopher. "Soul Music of Old Vienna". 2000.  In Broughton, Simon and Ellingham, Mark  with McConnachie, James and Duane, Orla (Ed.), World Music, Vol. 1: Africa, Europe and the Middle East, pp 13–15. Rough Guides Ltd, Penguin Books.

External links 
 Music Information Center Austria
  Audio clip: traditional Austrian music. Musée d'ethnographie de Genève. Accessed November 25, 2010.
 Schrammel-Quartett –  from the web encyclopedia www.aeiou.at
 Music Shoppe Gerald Braden Classical Music Channel, YouTube